Ann Street Halt railway station served the centre of Widnes in Cheshire, England. It was located on the southern section of the former St Helens and Runcorn Gap Railway.

History

Opened by the London and North Western Railway as a railmotor halt, it became part of the London Midland and Scottish Railway during the Grouping of 1923. The line then passed on to the London Midland Region of British Railways on nationalisation in 1948, only to be closed by the British Transport Commission three years later.

The site today

The site is buried under road developments.

Services
In 1922 six "Down" (northbound) trains a day called at Ann Street Halt, 'One class only' (i.e. 3rd Class) and 'Week Days Only' (i.e. not Sundays). The "Up" service was similar. The trains' destinations were St Helens to the north and Ditton Junction to the south, with some travelling beyond to Runcorn or Liverpool Lime Street.

In 1951 the service was sparser. Five trains called in each direction, Monday to Friday. On Saturdays three trains called in each direction, all were 3rd Class only. No trains called on Sundays.

References

Notes

Sources

External links
 Ann Street at Disused Stations
 The station on a 1937-1961 Overlay OS Map via National Library of Scotland
 Station on 1948 OS map. The station is just north of multiple lines north of word "Widnes".
 an illustrated history of the line via 8D Association

Disused railway stations in the Borough of Halton
Former London and North Western Railway stations
Railway stations in Great Britain opened in 1911
Railway stations in Great Britain closed in 1951
1911 establishments in England
1951 disestablishments in England